Charles Michael Moore (1923-1991) was an American politician from Maryland. He served as a member of the Maryland House of Delegates, representing Harford County, from 1955 to 1962.

Early life
Moore was born on September 1, 1923 in Havre de Grace, Maryland to Lena Lamm Moore and Leo M. Moore. His father was a member of the Maryland House of Delegates and was newspaper publisher of the Democratic Ledger. His grandfather, Michael Moore was also a member of the Maryland House of Delegates.

Career
Moore served in the United States Army Air Forces in World War II and became a sergeant.

Moore was a Democrat. He served as a member of the Maryland House of Delegates, representing Harford County, from 1955 to 1962.

He is buried at Mount Erin Cemetery, Havre de Grace, Maryland.

References

1923 births
1991 deaths
20th-century American newspaper publishers (people)
Burials in Maryland
People from Havre de Grace, Maryland
Democratic Party members of the Maryland House of Delegates
United States Army Air Forces non-commissioned officers
United States Army Air Forces personnel of World War II